Gonzalo Ariel Ontivero (born 14 November 1994) is an Argentine professional footballer who plays as a forward for Torneo Federal A side San Jorge, on loan from Argentine Primera División side Atlético Tucumán.

Career 
Officially debut in a match against Talleres de Cordoba, in his second game (against Union de Santa Fe) saw his first red of his career.
In the match against Gymnastics JJY He scored his first goal in his career.

References

External links
 
 
 
 
 
 
 Gonzalo Ariel Ontivero at Goal.com  
 Atlético Tucumán 2 - 1 Gimnasia Jujuy Alineaciones 07/02/14 Prim B Nacional at Goal.com 

1994 births
Living people
Sportspeople from San Miguel de Tucumán
Argentine footballers
Association football forwards
Argentine Primera División players
Torneo Federal A players
Atlético Tucumán footballers
San Jorge de Tucumán footballers